Puka Punchu (Quechua puka red, punchu poncho, "red poncho" or "silver ravine", Hispanicized spelling Pucapuncho) is a  mountain in the Andes of Peru, about  high. It is situated in the Puno Region, Lampa Province, on the border of the districts of Ocuviri and Santa Lucía. Puka Punchu lies southeast of Qullqi Q'awa.

References

Mountains of Puno Region
Mountains of Peru